In enzymology, a (3S,4R)-3,4-dihydroxycyclohexa-1,5-diene-1,4-dicarboxylate dehydrogenase is an enzyme that catalyzes the chemical reaction

(3S,4R)-3,4-dihydroxycyclohexa-1,5-diene-1,4-dicarboxylate + NAD  3,4-dihydroxybenzoate + CO + NADH

Thus, the two substrates of this enzyme are (3S,4R)-3,4-dihydroxycyclohexa-1,5-diene-1,4-dicarboxylate and NAD, whereas its 3 products are 3,4-dihydroxybenzoate, CO, and NADH.

This enzyme is a part of the terephthalate degradation pathway in bacteria.

Family 
This enzyme belongs to the family of oxidoreductases, specifically those acting on the CH-CH group of donor with NAD+ or NADP+ as acceptor.  The systematic name of this enzyme class is (3S,4R)-3,4-dihydroxycyclohexa-1,5-diene-1,4-dicarboxylate:NAD+ oxidoreductase. Another name in common use is (1R,2S)-dihydroxy-3,5-cyclohexadiene-1,4-dicarboxylate dehydrogenase.  This enzyme employs one cofactor, iron.

References

 

EC 1.3.1
NADH-dependent enzymes
Iron enzymes
Enzymes of unknown structure